"Unchained" is a song from Van Halen's fourth album, Fair Warning. The song was released as a single in various countries, including Germany, Spain and Japan.

Writing and composition
Vocalist David Lee Roth's working title for the song was "Hit the Ground Running". The song features prominent use of the MXR M-117 flanger, which became a popular sound and spurred sales of the pedal. A preset for the flanger was also included on the EVH Flanger MXR pedal. It uses a Drop D tuning with suspended fourth chords interspersed. The song is notable for being producer Ted Templeman's only vocal contribution to the band when he says "Come on, Dave, gimme a break!" during the interlude of the song.

Reception
Chuck Klosterman of Vulture.com named it the second-best Van Halen song, writing that it "merely feels like insatiable straight-ahead rock, but the lick is freaky, obliquely hovering above the foundation while the drums oscillate between two unrelated performance philosophies."

References

Further reading

1981 songs
1981 singles
Van Halen songs
Song recordings produced by Ted Templeman
Songs written by Eddie Van Halen
Songs written by Alex Van Halen
Songs written by Michael Anthony (musician)
Songs written by David Lee Roth
Warner Records singles